Zeta Trianguli Australis (ζ TrA) is a spectroscopic binary in the constellation Triangulum Australe. It is approximately 39.5 light years from Earth.

The binary's composite spectral class is F9V and its combined apparent magnitude is +4.90. The pair orbit each other once every 13 days, and the orbital eccentricity is a low 0.014, making it nearly circular.

Somewhat surprisingly for a star located at 70° S, it is a candidate swarm member of the Ursa Major moving group. However, there is some evidence to the contrary.

References

Trianguli Australis, Zeta
Triangulum Australe
F-type main-sequence stars
G-type main-sequence stars
Trianguli Australis, Zeta
Spectroscopic binaries
6098
147584
080686
0624
Durchmusterung objects